Rudi Zollinger (born 10 March 1944) is a Swiss former racing cyclist. His twin brother Paul was also a professional cyclist. He most notably finished 3rd overall in the 1966 Tour de Suisse. He also rode in the 1966 Paris–Roubaix.

Major results
1964
 4th Overall Tour de l'Avenir
1966
 3rd Overall Tour de Suisse
 7th Overall Tour de Romandie

References

1944 births
Living people
Swiss male cyclists
People from Schlieren, Switzerland
Sportspeople from the canton of Zürich